Ardkeen is a civil parish and townland (of 461 acres) in County Down, Northern Ireland. It is situated in the historic barony of Ards Upper.

Townlands
Ardkeen civil parish contains the following townlands:

Ardkeen
Ballycran Beg
Ballycran More
Ballygelagh
Ballyward
Bird Island
Calf Island
Cookstown
Craigaveagh Rock
Drummond Island
Dunevly
Great Minnis's Island
Inishanier Island
Inisharoan Island
Kirkistown
Lisbane
Little Minnis's Island
Long Island
Lythe Rock
Parton Island
Pherson's Island
Rainey Island
Ratallagh
Roe Island
Round Island
Sketrick Island
Trasnagh Island

See also
List of civil parishes of County Down

References